Christopher T. Kontos (born December 10, 1963) is a Canadian former professional ice hockey player. Kontos is best known for his nine goals in 11 playoff games while he was a member of the Los Angeles Kings and his franchise opening night four-goal performance (with the Tampa Bay Lightning) against that season's Vezina Trophy winner Ed Belfour.

Career
Born in Toronto, Ontario, Kontos played junior hockey for the Sudbury Wolves and Toronto Marlboros. During the 1981–82 OHL season he scored 42 goals, and after the season was drafted with the 15th selection in the first round of the 1982 NHL Entry Draft by the New York Rangers. He split his time in both the NHL and minor leagues in his first two seasons.

He was member of the Tulsa Oilers (CHL) team that suspended operations on February 16, 1984, playing only road games for final six weeks of 1983–84 season. Despite this adversity, the team went on to win the league's championship. Kontos spent the first half of 1985–86 playing in Finland before returning to finish the year in the AHL.  On January 21, 1987, Kontos was traded to the Pittsburgh Penguins for Ron Duguay, finishing his tenure with the Rangers with 38 points in 78 games.  He would score 25 points in 67 games with the Penguins over two seasons before being dealt to the Los Angeles Kings on February 5, 1988.

He played only six regular season games for the Kings in 87–88 tallying 12 points (another career highlight was a 6-point game against Chicago where Kontos had 1 goal and 5 assists), and scored a goal in his first NHL playoffs.  The following year, after returning from playing in Switzerland he scored three points in seven games, and his 9 playoff goals would help the Kings advance to the second round.  He played only 11 games (6 regular season, 5 playoff) with Los Angeles after the 1988–89 playoff run, and decided to join the Canadian National Team in 1991–92.

When the Tampa Bay Lightning started play in 1992–93, Kontos signed on as a free agent. His surprising 4-goal performance led the upstart Tampa Bay Lightning to a 7–3 shocker of the Chicago Blackhawks on October 7, 1992, and remains the team record for goals scored in a single game.  He scored 27 goals in 66 games, second on the team only to Brian Bradley.  He would return to the National Team in 93–94, and helped Canada win a silver medal at the 1994 Olympics.  Kontos would never return to the NHL, and continued to play in Sweden, the IHL and Germany before retiring in 1998.

Career statistics

Regular season and playoffs

International

Awards
He won the 1983-84 CHL Championship (Adams Cup) as a member of the Tulsa Oilers  team coached by Tom Webster.

References

External links

1963 births
Canadian ice hockey left wingers
Cincinnati Cyclones (IHL) players
Canadian people of Greek descent
Courmaosta HC players
Ice hockey people from Toronto
Ice hockey players at the 1994 Winter Olympics
Ilves players
EHC Kloten players
Living people
Los Angeles Kings players
Manitoba Moose (IHL) players
Medalists at the 1994 Winter Olympics
Muskegon Lumberjacks players
National Hockey League first-round draft picks
New Haven Nighthawks players
New York Rangers draft picks
New York Rangers players
Olympic ice hockey players of Canada
Olympic medalists in ice hockey
Olympic silver medalists for Canada
Phoenix Roadrunners (IHL) players
Pittsburgh Penguins players
Quebec Rafales players
Revier Löwen players
Skellefteå AIK players
Sudbury Wolves players
Tampa Bay Lightning players
Toronto Marlboros players
Tulsa Oilers (1964–1984) players
Canadian expatriate ice hockey players in Finland
Canadian expatriate ice hockey players in Germany
Canadian expatriate ice hockey players in Sweden
Canadian expatriate ice hockey players in the United States